The Republic of Moldova participated in the 2010 Summer Youth Olympics in Singapore.

Medalists

Archery

Girls

Mixed Team

Athletics

Boys
Field Events

Girls
Track and Road Events

Boxing

Boys

Canoeing

Boys

Judo

Individual

Team

Swimming

Taekwondo

Table tennis 

Individual

Team

Wrestling

Freestyle

References

External links
Competitors List: Moldova

Nations at the 2010 Summer Youth Olympics
2010 in Moldovan sport
Moldova at the Youth Olympics